Mankatha is the soundtrack album, composed by Yuvan Shankar Raja, to the 2011 film of the same name, directed by Venkat Prabhu that stars Ajith Kumar in the lead role along with an ensemble cast including Arjun, Trisha, Vaibhav, Lakshmi Rai, Andrea Jeremiah, Premgi and Anjali. The album features eight tracks, with lyrics penned by Vaali, Gangai Amaran, and Niranjan Bharathi. Following a number of postponements, it was finally released on 10 August 2011 by Sony Music India.

The soundtrack was described as a "mélange of techno, melody, a couple of duets and a mass song". The album features eight tracks, including one Theme music track and one club mix. The first track of the album, "Vilaiyaadu Mankatha" was launched as a single release in mid-May 2011, three months prior to the soundtrack release.

Production
In mid-October 2010, during Navratri, Yuvan Shankar Raja started composing the first tunes for the film. The "introduction song" of Ajith Kumar, "Vilaiyaadu Mankatha", for which he had taken "special care", and the item number song "Machi Open The Bottle...", labelled as a "mass song", were recorded first. In March 2011, sources claimed that a song titled "Vaada Bin Lada" was recorded with Krish and Suchitra, which was called a "funky techno duet" and referred to as the "present day version" of the song "Sorgame Endralum", while Yuvan Shankar Raja described it as a "futuristic duet". The song's basic tune was based on the Carnatic raaga Madhuvanti. Later that month, Venkat Prabhu made an announcement via Twitter, disclosing that the soundtrack album would consist of nine tracks, including one promotional track, one theme music track and one club mix, further adding that six songs had been composed and three out of them recorded already. The remaining songs were recorded from mid-June only, with Yuvan Shankar Raja informing the following month, that he had scrapped one of the songs, since he was not satisfied with its tune, and composed a new song, starting from scratch.

Reports in July 2011 revealed that the album would feature two more duets; "Nee Naan", which was sung by S. P. B. Charan and Yuvan Shankar Raja's sister, Bhavatharini, while Madhushree and Yuvan Shankar himself had sung the other one titled "Nanbane". The song "Nee Naan" was revealed to be the replacement for the scrapped song, which Yuvan Shankar Raja had composed within ten minutes of time, with the composer going to pick that song as his favorite from the album. Karthik and Vijay Yesudas had performed another song in the album, titled "Balle Lakka", which also features vocals of Anusha Dhayanidhi, wife of producer Dayanidhi Azhagiri, debuting as a playback singer. She was persuaded into playback singing by Venkat Prabhu who had seen her performing on her wedding reception and was impressed by her voice. The planned promotional track was excluded from the album in last minute. Earlier reports suggesting that one of the song would feature Yuvan Shankar along with his father Ilaiyaraaja's vocals, and that Andrea Jeremiah had sung another song, turned out to be false. Further Venkat Prabhu disclosed that S. P. Balasubrahmanyam and Shankar Mahadevan were approached to render one number in vain, with the former declining, explaining that the song was too high-pitched for his voice, and the latter being unavailable. The "Machi Open The Bottle..." song and the club mix of "Vilaiyaadu Mankatha" were notably orchestrated by Venkat Prabhu's brother Premji Amaran. The theme music was revealed to be inspired from a song by 50 Cent, with Prabhu and Yuvan Shankar adding that due credits had been given in the film.

Besides, Vaali and Gangai Amaran, who usually write lyrics for Venkat Prabhu's films, renowned poet Subramanya Bharathi's great great grandson, Niranjan Bharathi had penned one song ("Nee Naan"), becoming his first work in a feature film. The music rights were sold to Sony Music Entertainment who had reportedly offered  1 crores.

Release
The release of the soundtrack album was initially scheduled for 1 May 2011, coinciding with Ajith Kumar's birthday, but had to be postponed to mid-May, which too was missed, with the launch being pushed back to June. With the filming getting further delayed and the recording of the remaining songs not being completed yet, the projected release date of June had to be changed as well and Venkat Prabhu announced the new date as 18 July, which however was not approved by producer Dhayanidhi. The master CD was eventually handed over to Sony Music on 22 July 2011, which fixed the release date for 10 August 2011.

Since Ajith Kumar informed that he wouldn't attend any promotional events of his films, producer Dhayanidhi Azhagiri dropped the idea of a grand release function. The album was eventually released in a "soft launch"  at the Chennai station of Radio Mirchi during the breakfast show Hello Chennai, with Venkat Prabhu, Yuvan Shankar Raja, Vaibhav, Mahat and Ashwin being present. All the tracks from the album were premiered on the channel and played repeatedly, with the event being simultaneously aired across Radio Mirchi's stations in Coimbatore and Madurai. Two days later, a press meet was arranged at a preview theatre in Saligramam, Chennai and a special screening of two songs and the trailer was held.

Response
The album received overwhelming response, as did the release function itself, with reportedly over 7 lakh listeners having tuned into Radio Mirchi during the premiere. While the single track, "Vilaiyaadu Mankatha", had been declared a "smash hit" even before, the full album had achieved record breaking sales, with the associate director of Sony Music India South, Ashok Parwani, noting in a press release that Sony Music had registered a pre-booking of 60%.

Track listing

Personnel

Instruments
 Live drums & percussion: V. Kumar
 Additional keyboard program: Premgi Amaren
 Strings conducted by: Prabhakar
 String instruments: Babu
 Bass Guitar: Keith Peters
 Guitar: Keba
 Trumpet: Maxi & Babu
 Mandolin Veena: Devi
 Mridangam: Srinivas
 Tapes & Tavil: Sunder & Jeycha
 Additional percussion: L. V. Prasad, Sundar, V. Ramana, Jaicha

Production
 Program Manager: V. Karthik
 Program Co-ordination: A. S. Subbiah
 Recorded at: Prasad Studios & S.a.s.i Studios, Chennai
 Recorded by: M. Kumaraguruparan, Baranidharan, Prabhakar & Sekar
 Mixed at: Pinkstone Studios
 Mixed & Mastered by: M. Kumaraguruparan

References 

Yuvan Shankar Raja soundtracks
2011 soundtrack albums
Sony Music India soundtracks

Tamil film soundtracks